MV Empire MacCabe was a British oil tanker converted to a merchant aircraft carrier (or MAC ship), during World War II.

MV Empire MacCabe was built by Swan Hunter, Wallsend under order from the Ministry of War Transport. She entered service as a MAC ship in December 1943, however only her air crew and the necessary maintenance staff were naval personnel.  She was operated by the British Tanker Company.

She returned to merchant service as an oil tanker in 1946 and was scrapped in Hong Kong in 1962.

References

Oil tankers
Empire MacCabe
Empire ships
1943 ships